"The Night We Met" is a song from Irish boy band HomeTown. The song was released in Ireland as a digital download on 23 October 2015 through Sony Music Entertainment. It was released as the third single from their self-titled debut studio album. The song has peaked at number 59 on the Irish Singles Chart.

Reception
Sophie Bird from Flavour Mag said "Jamie Scott and One Direction’s Liam Payne worked with HomeTown on "The Night We Met"." adding "This song is exceptionally good.. [it] shows the bands incredible talents."

Music video
A music video to accompany the release of "The Night We Met" was first released onto YouTube on 19 November 2015 at a total length of three minutes and fifty-four seconds.

Track listing

Charts

Weekly charts

Release history

References

2015 singles
Pop ballads
2015 songs
Songs written by Liam Payne
Songs written by Mozella
Songs written by Jamie Scott
Sony Music singles
Songs written by Matt Rad